SB-204070 is a drug which acts as a potent and selective 5-HT4 serotonin receptor antagonist (or weak partial agonist), and is used for research into the function of this receptor subtype.

References 

5-HT4 antagonists
Piperidines
Amines
Chloroarenes
Carboxylic acids